The second Fürst Bismarck was an ocean liner of 8,332 gross tons built in Glasgow by the Fairfield Shipbuilding and Engineering Company for the Hamburg America Line. Launched on 22 March 1905, the vessel made her maiden voyage between Hamburg and New York, (with stops at Dover and Boulogne) on 19 August of the same year.

The launch of Fürst Bismarck in 1905 was captured by an operator-technician using a Lumiere Brothers Cinématographe.
 
On June 7, 1914, the ship's captain made an unexpected stop in New Orleans, to take on miscellaneous freight, while en route to Mexico, giving rise to rumors that it was transporting munitions. She carried no passengers on this trip and spent three days at the Port of New Orleans, loading nearly 3000 tons of materials from warehouses believed to be housing ammunition and military supplies. When the ship left three days later, the rumor had been denied by the captain.
 
The vessel was renamed Friedrichsruh in 1914.

In 1919, Friedrichsruh was surrendered to Britain (presumably as a result of the Versailles Treaty). She was scrapped at Genoa in 1935.

References

Ships of the Hamburg America Line
World War I passenger ships of Germany
Steamships
1905 ships